Donald William Hasselbeck (born April 1, 1955) is a former professional football player, a tight end in the National Football League (NFL) for the New England Patriots, Los Angeles Raiders, Minnesota Vikings, and the New York Giants.

Early life
Born and raised in Cincinnati, Ohio, Hasselbeck attended La Salle High School, where he was an all-city selection in both football and basketball.  He played college football at Colorado, where he majored in Fine Arts. He is currently ranked thirty-sixth on the all-time receptions list at CU.

Professional career
Hasselbeck was selected by the New England Patriots in the second round of the 1977 NFL Draft, where he played for the first six seasons of his nine-year career. He was traded to the Los Angeles Raiders early in the 1983 season; in Super Bowl XVIII, Hasselbeck blocked an extra point attempt by Washington. He then played for the Minnesota Vikings in 1984 and the New York Giants in 1985 before retiring; he scored the final touchdown of the Giants' season in a 17–3 NFC Wild Card victory over the defending Super Bowl champion San Francisco 49ers.

Family
Hasselbeck is married to Mary Beth "Betsy" (Rueve) Hasselbeck. He is the father of former NFL quarterback Matt Hasselbeck, formerly the starter for the Seattle Seahawks. Matt played on the Seahawks with Lofa Tatupu, who himself was the son of Don's teammate Mosi Tatupu.

Hasselbeck's second son Tim Hasselbeck was an NFL backup quarterback who currently works for ESPN as a Fantasy Football analyst and is married to Elisabeth Hasselbeck. His third son, Nathanael Nicolas (born 1981), played football at Boston College and the University of Massachusetts as a defensive back.

Don is the son of John William Hasselbeck and Molly M. (Lang) Hasselbeck.

References

External links

1955 births
American football tight ends
Colorado Buffaloes football players
Living people
Los Angeles Raiders players
Minnesota Vikings players
New England Patriots players
New York Giants players
Players of American football from Cincinnati